Hanumatha Rao or Hanumantharao is an Indian name common among Telugu speakers.
 C. H. Hanumantha Rao is an Indian economist and writer. He was member of National Advisory Council.
 Gundu Hanumantha Rao is a Telugu actor.
 Madapati Hanumantha Rao (1885 - 1970) was the first Mayor of the city of Hyderabad, India.
 Moturu Hanumantha Rao was a Communist party leader in the state of Andhra Pradesh, South India.
 Saluri Hanumantha Rao (1917–1980) was a music composer of South Indian films.
 S. N. Hanumantha Rao (1929-2013) was a Cricket umpire.
 V. Hanumantha Rao is a politician of the Indian National Congress party and a Member of Parliament.

Indian given names